All Saints’ Church, Ashover is a Grade I listed  parish church in the Church of England in Ashover, Derbyshire.

History
The porch of the church dates from 1275, the north aisle is mid-14th century. The remainder of the church dates from between 1350 and 1419, and was built by Thomas Babington.

A restoration was carried out in 1886 by Wans and Jolley of Nottingham. The western gallery was removed and the belfry and tower arch were opened out. The plaster was scraped from the pillars, arches and walls. The north door was also opened out.
 
Another restoration was undertaken in 1903 by Percy Heylyn Currey of Derby. The old seats were replaced we new oak pews carved by G and W Eastwood. The floor was re-laid with maple blocking and the heating system was overhauled. The stone paving in the aisles was relaid at the same height as the rest of the floor. The large reredos was moved from the east end and replaced with a smaller one. The church was reopened on 11 September 1903.

Organ
The first organ was installed in 1886 by Abbott of Leeds for a cost of £250 (equivalent to £ in ) but is no longer extant.

Parish status
The church is in a joint parish with: 
Holy Trinity Church, Brackenfield
Christ Church, Wessington

See also
Grade I listed churches in Derbyshire
Listed buildings in Ashover

References

Church of England church buildings in Derbyshire
Grade I listed churches in Derbyshire